In differential geometry, the Kirwan map, introduced by British mathematician Frances Kirwan, is the homomorphism

where
 is a Hamiltonian G-space; i.e., a symplectic manifold acted by a Lie group G with a moment map .

It is defined as the map of equivariant cohomology induced by the inclusion  followed by the canonical isomorphism .

A theorem of Kirwan says that if  is compact, then the map is surjective in rational coefficients.

References